Imbophorus pallidus is a species of moth of the family Pterophoridae. It is found in Australia.

References

Pterophorini
Moths of Australia
Moths described in 1991